Jesper Björnlund (born 30 October 1985 in Jukkasjärvi) is a Swedish mogul skier who competed finished 5th in the 2006 Winter Olympics and has two World Cup victories. He also participated for Sweden at the 2010 Winter Olympics in men's moguls.

References 

1985 births
Living people
People from Kiruna Municipality
Swedish male freestyle skiers
Olympic freestyle skiers of Sweden
Freestyle skiers at the 2006 Winter Olympics
Freestyle skiers at the 2010 Winter Olympics
Sportspeople from Norrbotten County